is a former Japanese professional baseball pitcher who played for the Fukuoka SoftBank Hawks in Nippon Professional Baseball's Pacific League.

Early life
Born in Yokosuka, Kanagawa, Takahashi attended Otsu Junior High School and Yokohama So-Gakukan High School. He was selected in the third-round of the 2004 draft by the (then named) Fukuoka Daiei Hawks.

Professional career
Takahashi spent seven years with the Hawks organization. In 2010, the sixth year of his professional career, he received a call-up to the club's first team and made his debut appearance on April 28, 2010 against the Tohoku Rakuten Golden Eagles. He pitched the 9th innings and allowed one run.
He made his second (and final) first-team appearance on May 10, 2010 against the Orix Buffaloes. He pitched 1 1/3 innings and struck out one batter, T-Okada.

In the 2011 season he pitched well in the farm league, but could not secure a call-up to the first league. He was released by the Hawks in December 2011.

He later announced via his Twitter account that he was retiring from professional baseball.

References

External links
Player Profile: Toru Takahashi

1987 births
Living people
Baseball people from Kanagawa Prefecture
Japanese baseball players
Nippon Professional Baseball pitchers
Fukuoka SoftBank Hawks players